Synclera danalis is a moth in the family Crambidae found in Sri Lanka. It was described by George Hampson in 1893.

References

Moths described in 1893
Spilomelinae